The Netherlands Antilles national football team (Dutch, "Nederlands-Antilliaans voetbalelftal"; Papiamentu, "Selekshon Antiano di futbòl") was the national team of the former Netherlands Antilles from 1958 to 2010. It was controlled by the Nederlands Antilliaanse Voetbal Unie. The NAVU consisted of Curaçao and Bonaire. Aruba split in 1986 and has its own team.

The Netherlands Antilles team never qualified for the FIFA World Cup. The country managed to come third in the CONCACAF championships of 1963 and 1969; during the 1963 tournament they were unofficial football world champions for four days after beating Mexico and before losing to Costa Rica.

History
Under the name Curaçao, the team played its first international game in 1934 (against Suriname, which was then still part of the Kingdom of the Netherlands as well) and continued to use the name Curaçao until the qualifications for the World Championships of 1958, although the name of the area had changed from "Territory of Curaçao" to "Netherlands Antilles" in 1948.

Dissolution of country
The Netherlands Antilles was dissolved as a unified political entity on 10 October 2010, and the five constituent islands took on new constitutional statuses within the Kingdom of the Netherlands, forming 2 new countries (Curaçao and Sint Maarten) and 3 new special municipalities of the Netherlands (namely Bonaire, Saba and Sint Eustatius).

At the time of the dissolution, the team was about to compete in the qualification tournament for the 2010 Caribbean Championship, and finally competed under an obsolete country name. Sint Maarten national football team, as well as Bonaire national football team are already members of CONCACAF, but are not members of FIFA. The Curaçao national football team took the place of the Netherlands Antilles as a FIFA member.

Successor teams

Coaching history
Caretaker manager are listed in italics.

 Pedro Celestino Dacunha (1957–65)
 Wilhelm Canword (1973)
 Jan Zwartkruis (1978–81)
 Rob Groener (1983–85)
 Wilhelm Canword (1988)
 Jan Zwartkruis (1992–94)
 Etienne Siliee (1996)
 Henry Caldera (2000–02)
 Pim Verbeek (2003–05)
 Etienne Siliee (2005–07)
 Leen Looyen (2007–09)
 Remko Bicentini (2009–10)
 Henry Caldera (2010)

Competitive record
*Draws include knockout matches decided on penalty kicks.

FIFA World Cup

CONCACAF Championship & Gold Cup

CCCF Championship

CFU Caribbean Cup

Olympic Games
 –1980: Amateur squads
 1984–1988: Professional squads
 1992–present : Under-23 squads

Pan American Games
 1951–1983: Amateur squads

Central American and Caribbean Games
 1930–1946: Full senior squads
 1950–1986: Amateur squads

All-time record against other nations
Updated 31 May 2012

Honours

This is a list of honours for the senior Netherlands Antilles national team
 CONCACAF Championship / Gold Cup:
 Third place (2): 1963, 1969
 CFU Caribbean Cup:
 Fourth place (1): 1989

Other tournaments
 Central American and Caribbean Games:
 Winners (2): 1950, 1962
 Four-Nations Tournament
 Winners (1): 1944
 Phillip Seaga Cup : Winners (1): 1963
 Inter Expo Cup / Chippie Polar Cup: Winners (1): 2004
 Runners-up (2): 2006, 2008
 Fourth place (1): 2005
 Parbo Bier Cup: Winners (1):''' 2004

See also
Bonaire national football team
Curaçao national football team (1921–1958) – the team before the change of country name to Netherlands Antilles
Curaçao national football team – the successor to the team 
Sint Maarten national football team
Netherlands national football team

References

External links
 Netherlands Antilles at the FIFA website.

 
Caribbean national association football teams
Football
Football in the Netherlands Antilles
Former national association football teams
National sports teams established in 1958
1958 establishments in the Netherlands Antilles

ja:サッカーオランダ領アンティル代表